The  Historical Bath of Siba  — Hamam Sibah , is a historical bathing complex of the ancient Sassanid culture, located in present-day southern Iran near the Straits of Hormuz.

Geography
The  Historical Bath of Siba  bath structures and ruins are located in the Kukherd District , in Hormozgan Province. They are under the administration of the city of Bastak.

The ancient baths are an archaeological site of Sassanid architecture. Modern public baths nearby use the same reportedly healing waters.

History
The  Historical Bath of Siba  public baths were built at natural hot springs, during the Sassanid Empire era (224– 651 CE). Ancient Sassanians built public baths to serve as rest centers. The baths served Sassanid government officials, the merchants from nearby sea ports and desert caravan routes, and the public.

Healing baths
Some of the baths had practitioners who offered healing treatments, using medicinal herbs and essential oils. These ointments were generally used for relieving joint pain and treating skin diseases.

The baths were known as the 'dumb doctor' because healers also treated patients silently with its healing hot spring waters.

See also 
Paraw Kukherd
Castle of Siba
Sassanid family tree — of the Sasanian (Sassanid) dynasty References 

 :ar:حمام سيبه Arabic wikipedias.
 :fa:حمام سیبه Persian Wikipedia.
2.	الكوخردى ، محمد ، بن يوسف، (كُوخِرد حَاضِرَة اِسلامِيةَ عَلي ضِفافِ نَهر مِهران) الطبعة الثالثة ،دبى: سنة 199۷ للميلاد **Mohammed Kookherdi (1997) Kookherd, an Islamic civil at Mehran river,  third edition: Dubai
3.	محمدیان، کوخری، محمد ، “ (به یاد کوخرد) “، ج1. ج2. چاپ اول، دبی: سال انتشار 2003 میلادی Mohammed Kookherdi Mohammadyan (2003), Beyade Kookherd, third edition : Dubai.
4.محمدیان، کوخردی ، محمد ،  «شهرستان بستک و بخش کوخرد»  ، ج۱. چاپ اول، دبی: سال انتشار ۲۰۰۵ میلادی Mohammed Kookherdi Mohammadyan (2005), Shahrestan  Bastak & Bakhshe Kookherd, First edition : Dubai.
5.عباسی ، قلی، مصطفی،  «بستک وجهانگیریه»، چاپ اول، تهران : ناشر: شرکت انتشارات جهان
6.   سلامى، بستكى، احمد.  (بستک در گذرگاه تاریخ)  ج2 چاپ اول، 1372 خورشيدى
7. اطلس گیتاشناسی استان‌های ایران [Atlas Gitashenasi Ostanhai Iran] (Gitashenasi Province Atlas of Iran'')
8. درگاه فهرست آثار ملی ایران

External links 
  Kookherd website.

Archaeological sites in Iran
Sasanian architecture
Bastak County
Kukherd District
History of Hormozgan Province
Monuments and memorials in Iran
Buildings and structures in Kukherd District